Castilleja mendocinensis is a species of Indian paintbrush known by the common name Mendocino Coast Indian paintbrush.

It is endemic to the coastline of Mendocino County, California, where it grows in coastal sage scrub habitat. It is also known from isolated occurrences in Humboldt County.

Description
Castilleja mendocinensis is a heavily branching, spreading perennial herb growing up to about 60 centimeters long. It is coated in bristles and light-colored rough hairs, giving it a gray-green color. The leaves are fleshy and rounded or oval in shape, and not more than about 2 centimeters long.

The inflorescence is made up of layers of lobed bracts which are greenish at the base and tipped with shades of bright orange-red to red. Between the bracts emerge the hairy, tubular flowers which are greenish or yellowish and sometimes red-tinted.

The fruit is a capsule up to 2 centimeters in length.

References

External links
Jepson Manual Treatment
Photo gallery

mendocinensis
Endemic flora of California
Natural history of the California chaparral and woodlands
Natural history of Mendocino County, California
Plants described in 1936